Ewing Virgil Neal (September 25, 1868 – June 30, 1949) was an American stage hypnotist (as Xenophon LaMotte Sage), author, fraudster, and a wealthy manufacturer of patent medicines and cosmetics. He spent much time in Paris and the French Riviera, and built the Château d'Azur in the hills above Nice. The street address is now Avenue Virgile-Neal.

Early life
Ewing Virgil Neal was born in Georgetown, Missouri, the son of school teacher Armistead A. "Pete" Neal, and raised in nearby Sedalia, Missouri.

Career
Neal worked as an instructor at a business college in Sedalia. Together with a few colleagues, he went to  a hypnotism show by Sylvain A. Lee, and saw "a blindfold drive, a window sleeper, and a cataleptic burial." As a result, they all then trained as hypnotists and left their college jobs.

Neal and his wife Mollie toured the US as a stage hypnotist, performing as Xenophon LaMotte Sage and Helen Olga Sage.

In 1904, he travelled to Europe and used tea sweepings to make caffeine. He then went into business with physician Herbert Arthur Parkyn and fellow hypnotist Elmer Sidney Prather, "running a complex network of fraudulent mail-order schemes". He also sold wrinkle eradicators, weight reducers, bust developers, hair restorers, and "Nuxated Iron".

Neal eventually moved into mainstream beauty products, and manufactured "Tokalon" powders and creams at factories in Paris and London, and sold them in 100 countries.

Neal also produced fragrances, including Petalia and Captivant de Tokalon that were sold in Lalique bottles. In February 2022, a 1923 René Lalique Petalia bottle sold for £25,000.

In the 1920s and 1930s, Neal spent much time on the French Riviera, and had the Château d'Azur built in the hills above Nice. The Château d'Azur was designed by the architect Adrien Rey, as a replica of the Château d'Azay-le-Rideau, and was completed in 1932. Neal was known locally as Le Duc, and entertained lavishly in his "genially overdecorated" Château. The street address is Avenue Virgile-Neal.

Personal life
In 1900, he was a publisher, living in Rochester, New York, with his wife Molly H. Neal, born May 1876, (both born in Missouri, all parents born in Kentucky) and one servant.

In 1914 and 1919, he was married to Harriett Meta Meister, born April 8, 1884, in Brooklyn, New York, and they were living at 927 Fifth Avenue, New York City.

In 1933, he arrived in New York City from Southampton, England, on the SS Europa with his wife Renée Bodier (age 36, born in Paris), his son Xen LaMotte Neal (born October 13, 1924, in Paris), a secretary, maid, valet and chauffeur.

In 1933, he sent his "magnificent" Maybach Zeppelin limousine back to France, along with his "buxom young wife, his buxom young French secretary, his 9-year-old son Xen LaMotte Sage (after the father's pseudonym), maids, valet, 30 trunks, 40 other pieces of luggage." His prize possession was a green leather booklet signed by Benito Mussolini, which he called his "Fascist Membership Card". Neal said, "Mussolini never gives his signature. Great man, Mussolini. We talk in French because I don't know much Italian."

Neal died in 1949.

Publications
Modern Illustrated Banking
Modern Illustrated Bookkeeping

See also
Carl R. Byoir

References

Further reading
 Conroy, M.S. (2006), The Soviet Pharmaceutical Business During the First Two Decades (1917-1937), New York, NY: Peter Lang. 
 Conroy, M.S. (2014), The Cosmetics Baron You’ve Never Heard Of: E. Virgil Neal and Tokalon (Third Edition), Englewood, CO: Altus History LLC. 
 Yeates, Lindsay B. (2016), "Émile Coué and his Method (I): The Chemist of Thought and Human Action", Australian Journal of Clinical Hypnotherapy & Hypnosis, Volume 38, No.1, (Autumn 2016), pp. 3–27.

1868 births
1949 deaths
American cosmetics businesspeople
American hypnotists
American non-fiction writers
People from Pettis County, Missouri
Writers from Missouri
American fraudsters
American publishers (people)
Perfumers